Lowcliffe is a lightly populated locality in the mid-Canterbury region of New Zealand's South Island.  It is situated on the shore of the Pacific Ocean between the mouths of the Hinds and Rangitata Rivers.  Nearby settlements include Coldstream to the west by the Rangitata River, Longbeach to the east on the other side of the Hinds River's mouth, and Hinds to the north.  The closest towns of significant size are Ashburton to the northeast and Geraldine to the west.

Lowcliffe is situated in a rural area that supports agricultural activities such as cropping, sheep husbandry, and dairy farming.  It had a small primary school that catered for students from year 1 to 8 and it has served the community continuously since its opening on 28 August 1893 with a roll of ten students. In 2011, Lowcliffe School closed after 118 years of operation due to declining school numbers.

Demographics
Lowcliffe is part of the Ealing-Lowcliffe statistical area.

References 

Ashburton District
Populated places in Canterbury, New Zealand